Priya may refer to:

 Priya (given name), a given name of Indian origin
 Priya (actress), stage name of Indian actress Karpagavalli
 Priya (1970 film), an Indian Malayalam film by Madhu
 Priya (1978 film), a Tamil film by S. P. Muthuraman
Priya, a 1992 Bengali film by Shibu Mitra
 Kokilapathmapriya Nadesalingam, known as Priya, one of a Tamil family seeking asylum Australia, in a case known as the Nadesalingam family asylum claims
 Priyah and Indo European love goddess